John J. Ricks (September 26, 1867 – August 31, 1920) was a professional baseball player who played third base in the Major Leagues for the 1891 and 1894 St. Louis Browns.

External links

1867 births
1920 deaths
Major League Baseball third basemen
Baseball players from St. Louis
St. Louis Browns (AA) players
St. Louis Browns (NL) players
19th-century baseball players